The Argentina women's national under-18 and under-19 basketball team is a national basketball team of Argentina, governed by the Argentine Basketball Federation.

It represents the country in international under-18 and under-19 (under age 18 and under age 19) women's basketball competitions.

References

External links
 Selecciones formativas at CABB
 Archived records of Argentina team participations

under
Women's national under-19 basketball teams